Na živo is a live album by the Serbian rock band Bjesovi, released in 2002.

Track listing 
All written by Goran Marić and Zoran Marinković, except where noted.
 "U osvit zadnjeg dana" (3:33)
 "Vraćam se dole" (2:39)
 "Vreme je" (4:59)
 "Ime" (4:32)
 "Ne budi me (ubij me)" (4:58)
 "Raduj se" (2:40) (Goran Ugarčina, Goran Marić, Zoran Marinković)
 "Sve će se doznati" (3:14) (Goran Ugarčina, Goran Marić, Zoran Marinković)
 "Čak i da mogu" (5:25)
 "Čekam dan" (3:31)
 "Kiša" (7:05) (Slobodan Vuković, Vlastimir Matović, Zoran Marinković)

Personnel 
 Dragan Arsić (bass) 
 Miroslav Marjanović (drums, backing vocals)
 Slobodan Vuković (guitar)
 Zoran Filipović (guitar)
 Zoran Marinković (vocals)
 Aleksandar Petrović Alek (percussion on track 10)
 Dejan Utvar (percussion on track 10)

External links 
 EX YU ROCK enciklopedija 1960-2006, Janjatović Petar; 
 Na živo at Discogs

2002 live albums
Bjesovi albums
Metropolis Records (Serbia) live albums